Syed Ahmed Raza Shah Jeelani is a Pakistani politician and the member-elect of the Provincial Assembly of Sindh.

Political career
Jeelani was elected to the Provincial Assembly of Sindh from the constituency PS-30 in 2018 Pakistani by-elections on the ticket of Pakistan Peoples Party defeating Syed Muharram Ali Shah of Grand Democratic Alliance

References

Living people
Pakistan People's Party politicians
Politicians from Sindh
Year of birth missing (living people)